Love is Duty Free is a 1941 comedy film directed by E. W. Emo and starring Hans Moser, Susi Peter, and Theodor Danegger. The film was made by  Wien-Film, a Vienna-based company set up after Austria had been incorporated into Greater Germany following the 1938 Anschluss. The film was intended to mock the First Austrian Republic and its democratic system of government as incompetent.

Synopsis
The financially hard-pressed Austrian government have arranged a secret deal with the Swiss, but an officious Austrian customs officer is unaware of this and arrests the Swiss representatives in the belief that they are wanted criminals.

Cast

References

Bibliography

External links 
 

1941 films
Films of Nazi Germany
German comedy films
1941 comedy films
1940s German-language films
Films directed by E. W. Emo
Films set in the 1930s
Films set in Austria
Nazi propaganda films
German black-and-white films
1940s German films